is a card battle RPG developed by Nintendo SPD and Intelligent Systems and published by Nintendo, and was released only in Japan on December 20, 2007 for the Nintendo DS. It is the successor of the Japan-only Nintendo Game Boy Color title, Trade & Battle: Card Hero. An updated version was released as a DSiWare title in Japan on July 29, 2009. No official announcement has been made about localizing the game outside Japan; however, Nintendo of America registered the Card Hero series trademark on May 8, 2009.

It features Maruo Maruhige and some altered versions of the monsters from the previous title of the series, as well as new monsters and three new main characters: Satoru, Haruka and their rival, Kiriwo.

Development
The development process mirrored the original Game Boy Color predecessor Trade & Battle: Card Hero with Yoshio Sakamoto and Nintendo R&D1 coming up with the script and character concept with the programming and design assistance coming from Intelligent Systems. For this sequel, Nintendo SPD Group No.1 (the newly reassigned remnants of Nintendo R&D1 again teamed up with Intelligent Systems. Mr. Sakamoto took on a producer role this time, with his younger staff members of Nintendo SPD Hirohi Momose (director), Kyoko Watanabe (script), and Fumiko Miyamoto (artist) handling the lead game design alongside Intelligent Systems.

Reception
At release, Famitsu gave the game a 36/40.

Notes

References

External links
 Official website (Kousoku Card Battle: Card Hero) 
 Official website (Card Hero Speed Battle) 
 Official Nintendo Online Magazine webpage 

2007 video games
Card games introduced in 2007
Digital collectible card games
DSiWare games
Intelligent Systems games
Japan-exclusive video games
Nintendo DS games
Nintendo DS-only games
Video games developed in Japan